The Echo is a 2023 Mexican-German documentary film directed by Tatiana Huezo. The film, which also includes fictional elements, portrays the children of an isolated village "El Echo", in the Mexican highlands. It is selected in Encounter at the 73rd Berlin International Film Festival, where it had its world premiere on 17 February 2023. The film is also nominated for Berlinale Documentary Film Award.

Content of the film

El Echo, a remote village in Puebla, the Mexican highlands, where conditions change drastically between seasons, the children tend to the sheep and take care of their elders. Dealing with the frost and drought, the children learn to understand death, illness, and love from every word and every silence of their parents. The Echo is a story about the echo of what lies in the soul, about the certainty of warmth from those around us, "about rebellion and vertigo in the face of life" and "about growing up".

Cast
 Montserrat Hernández Hernández (Montse)
 María de los Ángeles Pacheco Tapia (Abuela Angeles)
 Luz María Vázquez González (Luz Ma)
 Sarahí Rojas Hernández (Sarahí)
 William Antonio Vázquez González (Toño)
 Uriel Hernández Hernández (Uriel)
 Ramiro Hernández Hernández (Ramiro)
 Berenice Cortés Muñoz (Bere)
 Andrea González Lima (Andrea)

Production
The film is the fifth feature film by  Tatiana Huezo. Her two previous documentaries, El lugar más pequeño (2011) and Tempestad (2016), with this film forms a "trilogy of pain and trauma". She followed three families for one full year in the remote village in Mexico to film the project.

Reception
On the review aggregator Rotten Tomatoes website, the film has an approval rating of 100% based on 5 reviews, with an average rating of 9/10. On Metacritic, it has a weighted average score of 91 out of 100 based on 4 reviews, indicating "Universal Acclaim".

Guy Lodge reviewing at Berlin Film Festival, for Variety wrote, "This exquisitely textured film observes how children’s lives echo those of their parents, repeating for generations on the same constantly inconstant land, until somebody breaks the pattern." Lodge stated that Tatiana Huezo "observes this splintering community with unsentimental tenderness". He opined that the traditionally-inflected score of Leonardo Heiblum and Jacobo Lieberman occasionally sweetened the proceedings. Concluding, he said, "At the close, a hot white slice of lightning breaks the screen, signaling relief after a lengthy drought, but hardly an idealized long-term solution to the greater generational problems facing El Eco." Sheri Linden for The Hollywood Reporter called the film "A resounding achievement" and quoting dialogues from the film between father and daughter which goes as: "Work is work," "It’s not easy," he adds. "You have to do it with love." Linden opined that Tatiana Huezo "in this clear-eyed and warmhearted chronicle, has done precisely that." Wendy Ide for ScreenDaily wrote in review that the film is "an intimate, immersive portrait of a way of life – its rhythms, hardships and its communal joys – told through the eyes of the young people who rarely question it." Vladan Petkovic writing for Cineuropa stated, "True to its title, The Echo is about the background, about leftovers, and things left unsaid and never done. Petkovic concluding said, "It is a beautiful film that manages to be simultaneously restrained and immersive, poetic and earthy."

Accolades

References

External links
 
 The Echo at IDFA
 
 The Echo at Berlinale
 

2023 films
2020s Mexican films
Mexican documentary films
German documentary films
2023 documentary films
2020s Spanish-language films
Films shot in Mexico